The Noss Head Lighthouse is an active 19th-century lighthouse near Wick in Caithness in the Highland council area of Scotland. It is located at the end of Noss Head, a peninsula on the north-west coast of Caithness that overlooks Sinclairs Bay, three miles north-east of Wick. It is notable as being the first lighthouse that was built with a diagonally-paned lantern room.

History
The need for the lighthouse was promoted by the Northern Lights Commissioners. The light first entered service in 1849, and consists of an  cylindrical tower, which is painted white. It supports a single gallery and a lantern with a black cupola. There are 76 steps to the top of the tower. Adjacent to the tower are a pair of keeper's cottages and subsidiary buildings, bounded by a walled compound.

The lighthouse was built by Mr. Arnot of Inverness, with the construction being overseen by the notable lighthouse engineer Alan Stevenson (uncle of Scottish author Robert Louis Stevenson), who for the first time used diagonal glass panes and framing for the exterior lantern. Considered to be both stronger, and less likely to interrupt the light from the optic, the design was employed as the standard for all future lighthouses built by the Board.

As a way to provide work for those local people who had been affected by the Highland potato famine, and needed Poor Relief, labourers were hired at a rate of 3s/6d per day (£ as of ) to construct an access road from Wick to the lighthouse.

In 1987 the light was converted to automatic operation. This same year, all of the former keepers’ cottages and related structures were sold, along with the 39 acres of land upon which they were built. The sole exception being Noss Head Lighthouse Tower which, in 2018 is still owned and operated by the Northern Lighthouse Board (NLB).

Between 1997 and 2014, the Clan Sinclair Trust operated the former First & Second Assistant Lighthouse Keepers' dwellings as a residential study centre for research into the clan's history. Following the owner, Mr Ian Sinclair's death 2014, the properties remained empty until 23 May 2017. On that day, the Noss Head Lighthouse compound was purchased by subscribers of an internet website operated by Unique Property Bulletin Ltd., with the express purpose of halting problematic deterioration in the empty, decaying lighthouse buildings. A major refurbishment by the new owners has been undertaken. In addition, between October 2017 and May 2018, the Northern Lighthouse Board have been effecting significant schedule of repairs, plus maintenance and repainting of the main Lighthouse Tower. Both the private owners and the NLB aim to have the entire site at Noss Head Lighthouse compound back to the top Grade A condition that the Northern Lighthouse Board set for all of their statutorily listed properties.

In 2018, the Noss Head Lighthouse Principal Keeper's Cottage and Occasional Keeper's House remain as holiday accommodation. Whilst the former Engine House continues to be utilised as offices, workshop and the mess for retained lighthouse keepers employed by the Northern Lighthouse Board.

Following automation, the original Fresnel lens and mechanical drive train from the lighthouse were removed and are now exhibited on two floors of the Wick Heritage Centre, one of the few lens and drive train from this period that are still in full working order.

In October 2017 the main rotational light at Noss Head Lighthouse Tower was extinguished by the Northern Lighthouse Board and a new, static LED beam was installed. There is no longer a characteristic loom of the light across the sea from Noss Head following this innovation.

Operational details

With a focal height of 53m above sea level, the light can be seen for 25 nautical miles. Its light characteristic is made up of a flash of light every twenty seconds. The colour being white or red, varying with direction. The light and tower is maintained by the Northern Lighthouse Board, and is registered under the international Admiralty number A3544 and has the NGA identifier of 114-3012.

Listed buildings
The Lighthouse Tower, former First Assistant and Second Assistant Keeper's Cottages, along with the Stable Block are protected as a category A listed building, and considered to be of national or international importance. The original 1849-built Principal Keeper's Cottage and Occasional Keeper's House were demolished in the 1960s, and a modern detached rectangular single-storey newbuild replaced these to the west of the main lighthouse tower. The 1960s-built structures are not listed, although they are within the environs of the category A listed properties, and as such require appropriate protocols to be observed in relation to their maintenance and upkeep.

Language 
The most commonly spoken language is English and Scottish

See also

List of lighthouses in Scotland
List of Northern Lighthouse Board lighthouses
List of Category A listed buildings in Highland

References

External links

 Northern Lighthouse Board

Lighthouses completed in 1849
Category A listed buildings in Highland (council area)
Category A listed lighthouses